Qila Sura Singh is a village in the Punjab province of Pakistan. It is located at 30°39'5N 73°44'25E with an altitude of 168 metres (554 feet).

History
During the Sikh Misl period, the village was under the administration of the Sukerchakia Misl. Before Partition of Punjab Qila Sura Singh was inhabited by Sikh Labanas who were mainly land owners, farmers, soldiers, and civil workers. Some of the villagers were recorded to have served in the 48th Pioneers during the First World War. After partition mostly all of the Sikh villagers migrated to the  eastern half of Punjab, and what later became Haryana. Most of the refugees left before the major riots began in August, traveling through Jammu into Punjab. The inhabitants of Qila Sura Singh were accompanied by Sikhs and Hindus from surrounding areas. The descendants of the aforementioned refugees can be found mainly in the Doab region of the Punjab and Ambala district of Haryana.

References

Villages in Punjab, Pakistan